On the night of 29 October 2022, a crowd crush occurred during Halloween festivities in the Itaewon neighborhood of Seoul, South Korea. At least 159 people were killed and 196 others were injured. The victims were mostly young adults.

The crowd crush is the deadliest disaster in South Korea since the sinking of MV Sewol in 2014 and the largest mass casualty event in Seoul since the Sampoong Department Store collapse in 1995. A special police team, after completing weeks of investigation, concluded that a lack of safety precautions and other omissions contributed to the high number of deaths.

Background

History of the district
  The recent history of the Itaewons district of Seoul's Yongsan District is closely linked to the US military base Yongsan Garrison established in 1945. With the large number of bars and brothels, the area has been coded as a dangerous place for many Koreans. Twenty years after the Korean War (1950–1953), Itaewon became a shopping district. The district became gentrified, and in 2013 the US military moved its base with 17,000 soldiers to southern Seoul. Itaewon also became something of a home for the queer movement and was considered to be as open to foreigners as it was to Koreans. However, while representative commercial buildings had been erected in Itaewon, the area's characteristic of narrow streets had remained. Today, the district primarily attracts Koreans and international tourism, while earlier more than two-thirds of the gastronomic customers were Americans. Itaweon also became popular with people escaping the pressures of South Korean society, which was shaped by Confucian hierarchies and conformist views. Beginning around 2010, the concept of Halloween took on a life of its own in South Korea and has been further developed there, with consumption and marketing patterns playing an important role for retailers. The activities in Itaweon were captured in the 2020 K-drama Itaewon Class. During the COVID-19 pandemic Itaewon was a source of a major disease cluster traced back from over 130 confirmed cases. Authorities threatened those who attended the Halloween celebrations 2021 with harsh penalties if they violated COVID-19 social distancing rules.

Initial situation
The Itaewon district, located in central Seoul, is a popular location for nightlife gatherings, with trendy nightclubs, restaurants and bars. In the evening approximately 100,000 people, mostly in their teens and twenties, attended the Halloween festivities in Itaewon. It was the first time since the start of the COVID-19 pandemic that Halloween festivities could be attended without social distancing and without mask-wearing being required. 

Due to the growing popularity of Halloween celebrations and the potential for resulting accidents, authorities were concerned years before the disaster. In an internal document from 2020, which became known about opposition MPs, the police warned of possible deaths from imminent crowding.

However, a Seoul based newspaper reported that only 137 police officers were on duty at Itaewon, far fewer than the about 1,300 officers assigned for a BTS concert for 55,000 that occurred earlier in the month. Reportedly four days before the disaster the Itaewon police substation had requested backup due to the anticipated crowds, although a police notice two days beforehand did not mention the danger of crowds. It instead planned for sex crimes, theft, traffic congestion and drug and alcohol abuse.

Main venue

The area is characterized by very narrow streets and alleys without escape routes. The street in which the crush happened is connected to Itaewon-ro, the main street of the district; the lane slopes upward from Itaewon-ro and eventually meets with another street. This caused people to be packed and pushed downward along the narrow segment of the street. People at the top of the slope fell onto those below. The bottom of the alley measured only 3.2 metres, after a 10-meter-long iron temporary wall was built along the Hamilton Hotel about ten years ago.

Crush

Prior to the crowd crush, police had trouble controlling the festivities crowd. Witnesses said the streets, including the narrow downhill alley near Hamilton Hotel, were packed with partygoers. An attendee who arrived earlier in the night, at 19:00 local time, claimed that it took over 10 minutes to go to a meet-up spot about a minute from Itaewon station, because of the number of people. At least seventy-nine emergency calls were made to 112, between 18:00 and 22:00, prior to the crush with the first being made at 18:34. In the call, the caller said that an alley next to the Hamilton hotel was becoming extremely crowded and dangerous. The caller clarified after being prompted by the official that they felt that a large accident could happen if someone was crushed and fell.

At 22:08, people in the crowd started shouting. At 22:17, the crowd crush had already spread, according to experts, and the situation was aggravated by additional pressure from both ends of the street. The crowd crush occurred at 22:20 local time (KST), along an alleyway near Itaewon station Exit 1 and the Hamilton Hotel. Videos made by eyewitnesses showed that hundreds of people had been compressed in the narrow alley into a huge mass of bodies, five or six persons deep. One attendee said the crush started when a group of young men pushed others until people started falling. Some survivors claimed that because business hours were over, nearby establishments had blocked people from entering to escape the crush. A viral video showing some people partying and allegedly preventing ambulances from reaching the scene drew anger online.

An officer with instructions to wait to be dispatched in response to any crimes that night said that there had been no mention of crowd control that night or the days leading up to Halloween. He noticed the crush while responding to a suspected altercation near the alley, and was recorded attempting to alleviate the flow of people by stopping more people entering the top of the alleyway.

A specific, single cause for the accident has not yet been found (as of the end of 2022).

Emergency response 
  

Emergency officials said at least 11 calls were made by people experiencing compressive suffocation. Following calls made to the fire department at 22:15, four ambulances were dispatched. The large crowd made it difficult for ambulances to reach the scene. On arrival, first responders struggled to extract still-breathing victims from the crowd, which delayed critical first aid and resuscitation. Three off-duty United States Forces Korea soldiers who escaped by jumping onto a ledge helped to pull people out of the crowd.

As room was made and people were extracted from the crowd, dozens of unconscious victims emerged. Paramedics, police and bystanders performed CPR on those victims. Videos on social media showed scenes of turmoil as bystanders dressed in costumes attempted to resuscitate the unconscious. Emergency workers did not manage to get everyone out of the crush until well after midnight. With resuscitation failing, bodies were laid on the streets by medical and police personnel and covered with blankets and clothing. Some bodies were transported by ambulances. 

Eighty-three more ambulances arrived on site as late as 23:45. Phone and internet reception was temporarily saturated and out of service in the district because of the volume of communications attempted. Many of the victims were transported to Soonchunhyang University Hospital near Itaewon. An emergency message was issued to mobile phones in Yongsan, urging people to immediately return home because of an "emergency accident near Hamilton Hotel in Itaewon". According to the National Fire Agency and the Interior Ministry 848 emergency personnel, including all personnel available in Seoul and in addition 140 vehicles and 346 firefighters from across the country, had been deployed to the scene. US Army military police units of United States Forces Korea, who were conducting a routine patrol in the area with officers from the National Police Agency, assisted with first aid and maintaining public order on scene. At least three American soldiers reportedly rescued dozens from the crush.

Even after the area of the disaster was cordoned off by the police, some nearby bars continued to operate. Many people were unaware of the ongoing crisis.

On 9 November 2022, a "one-stop" support center was opened for those affected by the incident.

Victims

The Central Disaster and Safety Countermeasures Headquarters said there were at least 158 deaths. The known deaths consisted of 102 females and 55 males. Of the victims, four were teenagers, ninety-six people were in their twenties, thirty-two people were in their thirties, nine were in their forties, and thirteen have yet to be identified. In addition, 27 foreigners were among the dead. The majority of the people who died were women. 

At least 197 others were injured, including 32 in serious condition. 

According to the police, the exact place and time of the death of the 158 victims can hardly be determined.

Identification
The number of missing person reports filed on the following day grew from 355 to 4,024. Police said that they would identify the victims and relay information to family members.

By the afternoon of 30 October, about 90 percent of victims had been identified. The remaining 10 percent (12 bodies) were of local teens or foreign nationals. Officials said it was initially difficult to identify the deceased because of their Halloween costumes or because many were not carrying identification. The Hannam-dong Community Service Center served as a temporary missing persons center. Officials who usually deal with birth certificates or home registrations assisted in identifying victims. Workers at the center answered phone calls from the public regarding the missing. In just over seven hours, the center logged at least 3,580 call hours related to the incident.

One of the temporary morgues; the Wonhyoro sports center, was converted into a lost and found center for the identification of victims clothing and other items, with over 800 items recovered. Mobile phones and ID cards kept at a local police station.

Mental health
Many survivors of the Itaewon disaster subsequently suffered from post-traumatic stress disorder (PTSD). The National Center for Disaster and Trauma and local mental health welfare centers were treating (as of 13 December 2022) over 1,300 cases of surviving victims and survivors of the victims of the disaster. A high school student was found dead on 12 December in a motel in Mapo District, Seoul in a suspected suicide. The Ministry of Home Affairs and Security officially recognized him as the 159th dead of the Itaewon disaster on 3 January, citing legal and medical experts. The Ministry of Interior and Safety said bereaved families of the victim will be eligible for the same state support such as a financial relief as other victims. Regarding the young man who died at this time, the Prime Minister Han Duck-soo said to the victim, "I wish I was a little firmer", causing controversy. The opposition parties criticized it as 'a shocking absurd statement that blames the moat'.

Publication of the names of the fatalities
No official list of the deceased has been released. On 14 November 2022, media published a list with the names of 155 fatalities, which was later criticized. It did not disclose personal information such as the victims ages, or show their photos.The Minister of Public Administration and Security claimed in public that he did not have a list of deaths, but it was controversial when media reports said he had already secured the list.

Official investigations

Authorities did not immediately disclose what had caused the crush, but the chief of the Yongsan-gu Fire Department Choi Seong-bum said it was a "presumed stampede" and that many individuals fell. An official investigation was opened by the government, which promised new methods to prevent similar incidents. An investigation would also be opened to determine if bars and clubs followed safety regulations.

Police said that 100,000 attendees were expected in the area but only 137 officers were present, and they were primarily focused on drug crimes instead of crowd control. Police stated that they did not have a crowd control plan in place because the evening did not have a central organizer. In contrast, 6,500 officers had been assigned to manage demonstrations occurring elsewhere that night in the South Korean capital which were attended by 25,000 people. According to the local media, although Seoul is equipped with a real-time monitoring system that uses mobile phone data to predict the size of crowds, it was not activated on the night of the crush. The government maintained that it was not possible to predict the overwhelming crowd, but disaster prevention and urban planning experts refuted the government's position. They pointed out that authorities were aware of a large crowd due to the relaxation of COVID-19 rules, yet they deployed relatively few officers.

Experts on crowd safety explained that when crowd density exceeds eight to nine persons per square metre, a crowd can rapidly destabilize to the point where individuals can no longer escape. When a crowd crush suddenly develops in that fashion, persons trapped in the crowd will begin to lose consciousness within 30 seconds, and if not freed immediately, will be dead from compressive asphyxiation within six minutes. According to experts, once a crush is already in progress, "there is nothing more to be done" (in the sense that many victims will die before they can be rescued), and the real issue is not the number of security personnel per se, but whether those personnel have been adequately trained in crowd control and the necessity of monitoring and dispersing crowds well before they reach that point where death becomes inevitable.

KNPA Special Investigation Team
On 2 November, the national police (KNPA) raided the city's police departments as part of the investigation. According to the national police chief, Seoul police received 11 emergency calls as early as four hours prior to the incident, but failed to intervene. He added that the national police was only notified nearly two hours after the incident. Investigative teams raided police units, fire departments and offices to obtain documents for the investigation. An initial investigation uncovered that police did not respond appropriately to the emergency calls. Transcripts of the 11 calls made were released by the national police, noting that the Korean word which translates as "crushed to death" was used 13 times by callers. On 9 November, additional raids were made on the hotel adjoining the alley and two other locations, on suspicion that illegal extended structures from the buildings surrounding the alley had made it narrower over the years.

On 11 November, a police officer at Yongsan Police Station committed suicide. He was being investigated on charges of abuse of authority, destruction of evidence and professional negligence for ordering the deletion of a internal intelligence report warning of the dangers of gathering crowds in Itaewon. That same day a senior official from the Seoul Metropolitan Governments safety support division was found deceased by an apparent suicide. While he had not worked at the disaster site nor was investigated by the police, he had been the final approver of documents for emergency checks on local safety measures and psychological counseling programs for the disaster.

On 15 November the firefighters union sued the Interior Minister, who is in charge of public safety to force police to open an investigation. The union was challenging the governments statement that the night was not an organized event, and therefore the responsibility of public safety was unclear.

The arrests of former intelligence officers Park Sung-min of the Seoul Metropolitan Government and Kim Jin-ho of Yongsan Police are the first in an ongoing investigation into the disaster.

After completing its investigations on 13 January 2023, the special police team went public with its results. It said the lack of safety precautions and other omissions contributed to the high number of victims. According to KNPA, most of the deaths were caused by 
suffocation or brain swelling. South Korean police charged 23 officers, about half of them law enforcement officials, with involuntary manslaughter and negligence. Experts have called the crush in Itaewon a "manmade disaster". According to the KNPA report, many died after falling and piled on top of them by other people from the crowd.

Parliamentary Inquiry
On 9 November 2022, the opposition Democratic Party of Korea (DPK), the Justice Party and the Basic Income Party submitted formal requests for an investigation.

On 23 November 2022, the ruling People Power Party (PPP) abandoned its previous opposition to a parliamentary inquiry, and ruling and opposition parties agreed to launch a parliamentary inquiry into the Itaewon Halloween disaster.

On 19 December 2022, the Special Committee Inquiry into the Itaewon disaster was formally launched by the head of the Special Committee, MP Woo Sang-ho, in the National Assembly.

On 10 January 2023, the parliamentary special committee to investigate the Itaewon disaster held a first public forum to allow experts to have their say.

At a public hearing as part of the parliamentary inquiry, expert Lee Kyung-won, professor of emergency medicine at Yonsei University, requested that an emergency medicine physician should be on site to provide support as an expert.

Criticism and protests 
 
Unlike other mass calamity incidents that occurred internationally shortly before the 29 October 2022 Halloween disaster, such as the 2021 Astroworld Festival crowd crush in Houston, or the 2022 Kanjuruhan Stadium disaster in Malang, which soon became the target of criticism for the organizations and security forces, no official event sponsors or organizers existed at the Halloween celebrations in Itaewon. Many South Koreans instead blamed the police force and officials, although some began debates about how far the blame should be placed in concern that some would become scapegoats. First responders have raised claims that they are being scapegoated in order to save politicians careers as the investigation showed their shortcomings, along with a lack of preparation. Additionally, business owners near the crush have raised fears that the area and its businesses will be scapegoated due to continued stigma around nightlife in Seoul.

First responders 
Criticism about the first responders response and the handling of the tragedy and the events leading up to it was high in young South Koreans, who had been children or teenagers during the sinking of the MV Sewol. A few participate in protests in Itaewon, and held signs stating phrases such as "It could have been prevented. The state was not there." or "6:43pm" in reference to the first emergency call. Thousands gathered in central Seoul at a candlelight vigil organised by a civic group linked to South Korea's main opposition party, with many holding signs that said: "Step down, Yoon Suk-yeol." Additional criticism was leveled about the handling of the investigation into the disaster, with many highlighting the targeting of only front line working officials and not any of the police chiefs, or the Ministry of Interior and Safety.

Young-ook Kim, an expert in mass movement and spatial arrangement and behavior at Sejong University in Seoul, said in the Washington Post, "If you just surveyed the site and discussed possible countermeasures, anyone with instinct and experience would have  able to foresee the situation."

Controversy government and party 
Opinion polls show that 7 out of 10 South Koreans believe that the government is responsible for the stampede.

At the time of the disaster, it was reported that duty officers at the Yongsan-gu Office were working on removing leaflets criticizing President Seok-Yeol Yoon near the Samgak area of ​​Seoul Subway Line 4.This led to claims that the response to the disaster was delayed.

In addition, a document created by the police for the purpose of exploring the trends of bereaved families and civic groups related to the disaster after the disaster became controversial. The Kyunghyang Shinmun said in a report, "In this document, there are expressions that are reminiscent of the intelligence police's surveillance of civilians in the past." In this document, in relation to the Sewol ferry disaster in the past, a law was created to counter attempts to interpret the disaster as government responsibility.

A city council member belonging to the ruling party, the People's Power Party, became controversial because he spoke harshly to the bereaved family. In the messages posted on social media, city council member Mi-na Kim made comments such as ‘a foolish mother’, ‘a trick to get a share by selling her children’, and ‘there is a sound of selling her children and doing business’, which caused controversy. Public opinion grew that she should be removed from the council, but she was not expelled thanks to the protection of the PPP members who had a majority on the city council.

Afterwards, the government did not allow the bereaved families to hold a memorial service on the 100th day of the disaster.

Usage of terms

"accident"
The South Korean state announced that it would use the term "accident" instead of "disaster" to avoid damaging Itaewon's reputation as a popular tourist destination. The decision caused increasing public outrage. It was objected that the term "accident" suggested that the mass accident in Itaewon happened by accident, although there was a suspicion, which had not yet been verified by investigations, that the mass accident could be seen in connection with insufficient civil protection measures.

"mass panic" or "stampede"
 Experts such as Milad Haghani (School of Civil and Environmental Engineering at the University of New South Wales), Edwin Galea (University of Greenwich) or John Drury (University of Sussex) took the view just a few days after the accident that the  Labels such as "stampede" or "crowd surge" prevalent in the media are incorrect as they would presuppose that people in the crowd had had space to move.

Martyn Amos, Professor of Computer and Information Sciences at Northumbria University, said that "Stampede" is a highly problematic term. According to Amos, the increasingly urbanized nature of society requires a better understanding of crowds.  Amos further argued that human groups need to be understood as complex, dynamic systems of human "parts" that interact with each other and their environment, and beyond the "tired" narratives of "mob", "stampede", and "panic". "This requires further funding for an interdisciplinary approach based on physics, computer science, social psychology, sociology, criminology, police and politics".

According to Juliette Kayyem, a disaster management expert and international security professor at the Harvard Kennedy School, no specific triggering event needs to have happened to explain the Itaewon Halloween celebration tragedy.  In her estimation, what she believed to be factors such as the large crowd, narrow streets and lack of public safety were enough. Kayyem drew parallels between the Itaewon Halloween disaster and the Bethnal Green disaster of 1943, in which an air raid in London killed 174 people on the steps leading to Bethnal Green tube station.

Aftermath

In South Korea, the Halloween disaster in Itaewon was largely attributed to incompetence and indifference on the part of the South Korean state.  Although both South Korean Minister of the Interior Lee Sang-min and the Interior Ministry's subordinate police have repeatedly acknowledged their own mistakes and failures, no official official has specifically agreed to accept responsibility.In a poll, more than half of South Koreans demanded the resignation of minister Sang-Min. 57% of respondents said the government's investigation was insufficient. In February 2023, Sang-Min was suspended from his position by the National Assembly for his handling of the disaster. He was succeeded by Han Chang-seob.

Mourning and memorial sites 
On 31 October, about 4,000 people, including Seoul's mayor, the prime minister, and the president, attended a memorial at Seoul Plaza. 
The Yongsan-gu District Office erected a memorial altar near Noksapyeong Station on 31 October. Memorials were established across 17 cities including Busan, Daegu and Incheon. The Health and Welfare ministry said psychological assistance would be provided at counseling booths at memorials in Seoul. Psychological assistance was also provided for schools where the victims studied. 

By 13 November the initial memorial created around the exit 1 of Itaewon Station had expanded to cover about 20 meters of sidewalk from the station to the entrance of the alley where the disaster occurred. Many anonymous volunteers work together to keep the memorial in good shape and free of trash or rotting foods, as many leave food and drinks as offerings to the deceased normally via a ceremonial table. With the help of Yongsan District Official officials they have also coordinated to protect the memorial and offerings from any rain or other weather. Mourners had posted sticky notes all over the subway station exit. Hundreds of white chrysanthemum flowers were set up. Even after mid-December 2022, mourners around Itaewon subway station continued to pay tribute to the victims of the Halloween disaster by leaving flowers and expressions of condolence.

Buddhist orders 
On 1 November, Buddhist monks and Sangha members gathered in central Seoul among representatives of South Korea's seven major religious orders to commemorate the people. The President of South Korea's largest Buddhist order, the Jogye Order, Ven. Jinwoo said, "Such a disaster should never happen again, and we pray for the rebirth of the victims in paradise." The delegates came from the Korean Conference of Religions for Peace, an advisory body representing the major religious communities in South Korea.

From November 9 to 11, the Jogye Order Social and Labor Affairs Committee conducted Buddhist rites at Itaewon Station Exit 1, and called for an investigation into the disaster.

Survivors of the victims 
On 22 November, some relatives of victims held a press conference. A six-point proposal called for, among other things, a thorough investigation of those responsible and the avoidance of consequential damage. The press conference was organized by the non-profit advocacy group Lawyers for a Democratic Society, or "Minbyun".

On 21 December 2022, the bereaved families of many of the victims of the Halloween disaster called for more and swifter justice and lamented the continuation of widespread "unaccountability". The police investigation was criticized by the bereaved for failing to hold top officials accountable.

Response

Local

President of South Korea Yoon Suk-yeol attended an emergency briefing. He suggested swiftly treating the injured and reviewing the safety of festivity sites. He addressed the nation the following morning and later visited the scene of the incident. A week of national mourning until 5 November was declared by President Yoon, ordering flags at government buildings and public offices to fly at half-mast. The Mayor of Seoul, Oh Se-hoon, who was on a trip to Europe at the time of the incident, returned to Seoul.

In the days following the crush, amid growing criticism over the management of the event, interior minister Lee Sang-min offered an official apology and National Police Chief Yoon Hee-keun said "There were several reports to the police just before the incident occurred and it was known that a massive crowd had gathered, indicating the urgency of the danger. However, information management was insufficient and there was no adequate reaction from the police".

Businesses
South Korea's retail and entertainment sector withdrew Halloween-related products from shelves or canceled events. All festivals at theme parks, including Everland in Yongin and Lotte World in Jamsil, were canceled. Starbucks outlets stopped Halloween promotions and the sale of themed products. Convenience store chains, including CU and GS25, stopped selling Halloween-themed products online. SM Entertainment announced that its scheduled Halloween events would not take place. Entertainment companies such as SM Entertainment, YG Entertainment, JYP Entertainment, and Hybe Corporation, among others, announced the cancellation and postponement of various artist comeback schedules and events. 

Following the declaration of the week-long national mourning period, major broadcasting stations KBS, MBC, SBS, tvN, and JTBC suspended all of their music and entertainment programming beginning on 30 October, in favor of continuous news coverage. MBC also canceled the 2022 Qatar World Cup production presentation scheduled to be held on 1 November. In the music industry, concerts were cancelled and album release schedules of some artists were temporarily postponed.

Lee Eun Hee, professor of consumer studies at Inha University said, "When a business district starts to die for any reason, it collapses non-stop. Only when the sadness of the tragedy subsides and people realize that Itaewon as a whole is safe can the industrial park be revived."

During the 2022 Christmas season, businesses around Itaewon subway station and the World Food Culture Street area suffered from the effects of the Halloween disaster. Surrounding areas were also affected. Itaewon's 2023 holiday season is reported to have seen just 10 percent of last year's holiday season's traffic, while other popular Seoul nightlife districts such as Hongdae and Myeongdong saw heavy crowds at the same time. The finance ministry said on 16 November that consumption at three major department stores had slowed last month.

International
 

 Various heads of state and government sent condolences to the families of the victims within the first day after the disaster and expressed their condolences to the South Korean population. 

US President Joe Biden said, "We grieve with the people of the Republic of Korea and send our best wishes for a quick recovery to all those who were injured. The Alliance between our two countries has never been more vibrant or more vital, and the ties between our people are stronger than ever." Japanese Prime Minister Fumio Kishida said that he was "shocked and deeply saddened by the loss of many precious lives." China's president Xi Jinping paid condolences to the victims in a letter. British Prime Minister Rishi Sunak tweeted: "All our thoughts are with those currently responding and all South Koreans at this very distressing time.". Other leaders, including those of Russia, Norway, Canada, Hungary, the Vatican and Italy, also expressed sympathies with the people of South Korea. Condolences were also sent by the leaders of India, Malaysia, and Vietnam. German's president Frank-Walter Steinmeier and his wife pay their silent respects after laying flowers at the memorial altar for the victims of the Itaewon disaster in front of Exit 1 at Itaewon Station. He said: "I express my deepest condolences to President Yoon personally and on behalf of the German people."

In Japan on 31 October 2022, following the Itaewon disaster, police had a heavy presence in Tokyo's Shibuya neighborhood, urging people to keep moving at Shibuya Crossing (Japanese: 渋谷スクランブル交差点;). At the famous pedestrian crossing, officials herded crowds together by forming human chains along the crosswalk. Police officers on raised platforms, often dubbed "DJ Police," issued continuous announcements.

Depiction in media
Social media and online sites in South Korea issued statements to users to refrain from spreading any video footage or other information about the disaster. KakaoTalk, a messenger app widely used in Korea, issued a notice to all users, asking them to act with caution with information about the disaster, while Naver and Twitter also issued similar statements. Footage of the disaster and its aftermath were recorded and/or livestreamed and posted on a variety of different social media platforms, with at least one livestream of the events and the disaster seen on a TikTok live stream. These videos were often not censored or edited for modesty or other reasons, compared to footage taken and shared by news outlets. This has caused the South Korean Personal Information Protection Commission to announce their intention to search out any footage that had any personal identifying information present and remove it, with similar pledges taken by Twitter and two other online platforms in South Korea.

Effects on school children and teenagers
Children in South Korea turned the Halloween disaster into a questionable game. The game involves numerous school kids lying on top of each other to form a stack, and the one on the bottom wins based on how many people he or she can endure on top of their body. Videos under the name of "Itaewon Game" or "Itaewon Crush Game" it spread on social media, such as TikTok.

Disaster related ethics guidelines 
An official statement by the Korean Neuropsychiatric Association specifically highlighted the "horrific videos and photos" of the disaster that were being shared without any filtration, which could cause damage to others.
By 8 November the Korea Communications Standards Commission was reportedly sent over 100 requests to have video and pictures related to the disaster taken down from social media sites. Additional concerns about the need to create disaster related ethics guidelines on digital content for social media sites and those that upload the footage. Koo Jeong-woo, professor of sociology at Sungkyunkwan University in Seoul, said, "For now, there are almost no guidelines on posting and sharing disaster footage on online platforms. Considering their far-reaching power of influence, these platforms should fulfill their social responsibility to come up with a manual." He further said, "Those who upload such content as well as those who consume it should also take efforts to keep a sense of ethics and consume digital content responsibly."

By 2 November, there were ten times as many searches for the National Center for Disaster and Trauma as there had been one week earlier on Google Korea; searches for the related phrases trauma center and trauma symptoms also increased. Chae Jeong-ho, professor of psychiatry at the College of Medicine of the Catholic University of Korea and president of the Korea Society for Traumatic Stress Studies, said, “You didn't have to be there to experiencing trauma".  According to Frontiers magazine, "Mass trauma or collective trauma is defined as the psychological response of an entire group to a traumatic event that affects society as a whole."

See also

List of fatal crowd crushes
List of man-made disasters in South Korea

References

External links

2022 disasters in South Korea
Halloween crowd crush
Crowd collapses and crushes
Halloween crowd crush
Halloween events
Itaewon
Man-made disasters in South Korea
October 2022 events in South Korea